Luteococcus sanguinis is a Gram-positive bacterium from the genus Luteococcus which has been isolated from human blood in Sundsvall, Sweden.

References 

Propionibacteriales
Bacteria described in 2003